The Curse is the second studio album by American metalcore band Atreyu. It was released on June 29, 2004, under Victory Records. The album went on to produce three singles, "Bleeding Mascara"  "Right Side of the Bed" and "The Crimson".

The videos for "Right Side of the Bed" and "The Crimson" achieved much airplay on television networks such as MTV2 and Fuse. The songs also received airplay on some radio stations across various countries. Since its release, The Curse has gone on to sell more than 500,000 copies and it was certified gold by the RIAA on September 14, 2020.

Critical reception

AllMusic said that the record "expands mightily on the promise and power of their debut, Suicide Notes and Butterfly Kisses", praising the band for using the effects from touring for their first album to "bring[s] forth an explosion of creativity" throughout the track listing, concluding that with "a set of songs this good it's hard to resist the thought that Atreyu's punishing work ethic may not be such a bad thing for their music." A reviewer for Punknews.org gave praise to the band's improved vocal performances and the "sheer ferocity of their metal-tinged songs", but was critical of both the metal and non-metal tracks being "too distinct" and lacked the consistent balance of "metal and melody" they had in Suicide Notes, concluding that "Still, with that, this album is a must own for fans of the band and also for fans of the genre. Atreyu has still shown that metalcore can be awesome." Kirk Miller, writing for Rolling Stone, said about the band's use of the metalcore genre, "On record, the results are more confused, with dual vocalists Alex Varkatzas and Brandon Saller occasionally canceling each other out. But when the band sticks to melody and brings out the big arena-rock drums on songs such as "Right Side of the Bed," it creates true headbanging nirvana. And those guitar solos? Pure awesomeness."

Track listing

 A limited edition version of The Curse, which was only available at Best Buy stores, included a cover of Bon Jovi's "You Give Love a Bad Name" (Bonus Track). It was limited to 30,000 copies and used another cover, which is in black. The track is also included on the Japanese release.
 "Right Side of the Bed" appears on the soundtrack for the video game Burnout 3: Takedown.

Colored vinyl releases
 Clear Green (unknown)
 Clear (1040 copies)
 Red (1023)
 Gold (1019)
 White (121)
 Blue (500)
 Clear with Black Smoke (120)

Limited edition re-release
On June 28, 2005, Victory Records re-released The Curse with a bonus DVD. The bonus DVD included four of the band's music videos, as follows:
 "Ain't Love Grand" (Music video)
 "Lip Gloss and Black" (Music video)
 "Right Side of the Bed" (Music video)
 "The Crimson" (Music video)
Only 30,000 copies of the limited edition version of the album were pressed and each copy is numbered in accordance.

Instrumental Version
Available on iTunes. Based on the normal 13 track version of the album.

Personnel

Band line-up
 Alex Varkatzas - unclean vocals
 Dan Jacobs - lead guitar
 Travis Miguel - rhythm guitar
 Marc McKnight¹ - bass
 Brandon Saller - drums, percussion, clean vocals, keyboards, programming

¹ Marc McKnight is listed as a member of the band but it is unclear as to whether he played bass on the recording. On The Curse DVD McKnight can be seen playing bass in nearly all of the songs recorded. The band gives thanks to Tom Macdonald, from the Canadian pop rock band, Hedley, for "lending his bass skills" to the recording, but it is not known whether he played bass on every song or only a select few.

In an interview with Toazted, posted on YouTube in 2012, Brandon Saller claimed that they had hired a studio bass player and McKnight picked up playing with the band at the beginning of tour. He had learned all of the songs 3 weeks prior to the tour, and played his first show at a festival in Las Vegas for over 2,500 people.

Additional credits
 Album layout by Jason Link and Alex Varkatzas
 Band photographs by Sean Stiegemeier
 Digital editing by Ben Kaplan; assisted by Lee Robertson, Kurt McNally and Brian Gallant
 Effects, make-up and teeth fabrication (model) by Louie Zakarian
 Engineered by Dean Maher
 Hair (model) by Silvia McBride
 Mastered by Howie Weinberg
 Mixed by Josh Wilbur
 Model is Natalia Delano
 Photography (model) by Thomas Bogucki
 Produced by GGGarth
 Re-touching (model) by Peter Possenti
 Styling (model) by Selena Leong
 Lyrics by Alex Varkatzas

Charts
Album - Billboard (North America)

Certifications

References

2004 albums
Albums produced by Garth Richardson
Atreyu (band) albums
Victory Records albums